Raikabula Momoedonu (born 28 March 1998) is a Fijian rugby union player who currently plays for the Fijian Drua in Super Rugby. His position is flanker.

Professional career
Momoedonu was named in the Fijian Drua squad for the 2022 Super Rugby Pacific season. He also represented  in the 2021 Bunnings NPC.

References

External links
 

1998 births
Living people
Fijian rugby union players
Rugby union flankers
Northland rugby union players
Fijian Drua players